The Signal Battalion was a Lithuanian army unit in 1927–40.

History

Creation 
The Signal Battalion was established in September 1927 in Šančiai, Kaunas, in place of the disbanded Technical Regiment. The battalion carried out the tasks and functions of the previously existing Electo-technical and Technical battalions.

Purpose 
It maintained the military telephone network, communication during army training, trained liaison officers for the signal battalion itself as well as the whole Lithuanian army. The communications battalion was directly subordinated to the headquarters of the military technical units. 

The organizational structure of the Lithuanian army's infantry divisions also included signal battalions, but not as large in size as the army-level signal battalion. It was planned that during a war, the divisional signal battalion would consist of 426 soldiers. Such numbers meant that these battalions were to be half the size of the divisional battalion-level engineer or cavalry units. The infantry division's signal battalion consisted of a headquarters, a radio company, and a telephone-telegraph company.

Composition 
The signal battalion consisted of headquarters, agricultural, technical, sanitary and veterinary departments, radio and telephone-telegraph companies. The battalion owned the Army's Central Pigeon station and the Signal Dog School. 

In January 1938, there were 28 officers, 455 soldiers and 31 civil servants in the battalion, while the battalion had 57 horses. By 1940, this had grown to 590 soldiers.

Soviet occupation in 1940 
In June 1940, after the Soviet occupation of Lithuania, the battalion was reorganized into the Signal Battalion of the Red Army's 29th Territorial Rifle Corps, while some soldiers were transferred to the communications battalions of the 179th and 184th Rifle Divisions.

Equipment 
The battalion had 2 German radio stations UFI 75, 2 French field radio stations E.R. 400, British-made and Lithuanian portable radio stations RK 1, radio direction finding receivers Telefunken and other equipment.

Commanders 
The battalion's commanders were K. Voicechauskas, M. Vitkūnas‑Vitkauskas, J. Šepetys.

References

Sources 

 
 

Army communications units and formations
Battalions of Lithuania
Military communications units and formations of Lithuania
Military units and formations established in 1927
Military units and formations disestablished in 1940